Richard Stewart Addinsell (13 January 190414 November 1977) was an English composer, best known for film music, primarily his Warsaw Concerto, composed for the 1941 film Dangerous Moonlight (also known under the later title Suicide Squadron).

Biography

Early life
Richard Addinsell was born in Woburn Square, London, to William Arthur Addinsell, who was a chartered accountant, and his wife, Annie Beatrice Richards. The younger of two brothers, Addinsell was educated at home before attending Hertford College, Oxford, to study Law but went down after just 18 months.  He then became interested in music.

Early career
In 1925, he enrolled at the Royal College of Music but lasted only two terms before leaving, again without obtaining any formal qualification. By this time Addinsell was already collaborating with Noel Gay, among others, in an André Charlot Revue. More work for Charlot in 1927 was followed in 1928 by a collaboration with Clemence Dane on Adam's Opera at The Old Vic. In 1929, he completed his informal education by touring Europe to visit major theatrical and musical centres such as Berlin and Vienna.

In 1932, with Clemence Dane, he wrote the incidental music for the Broadway adaptation of the combined Alice in Wonderland and Through the Looking Glass by Eva Le Gallienne, starring Josephine Hutchinson (produced 1933).  In 1947 it was revived, starring Bambi Linn.

Career in film composition
The Warsaw Concerto was written for the 1941 film Dangerous Moonlight, and continues to be a popular concert and recording piece. The film-makers wanted something in the style of Sergei Rachmaninoff, but were unable to persuade Rachmaninoff himself to write a piece. Roy Douglas orchestrated the concerto. It has been recorded over one hundred times and has sold in excess of three million copies. Addinsell also scored Hitchcock's Under Capricorn (1949), referencing Irish folk melody in the score to support the Irish characters and their history.

Addinsell also wrote the short orchestral piece Southern Rhapsody, which was played every morning at the start of TV broadcasts by the former Southern Television company in the south of England from 1958 to 1981.

As was common with film music until the 1950s, many of Addinsell's scores were destroyed by the studios as it was assumed there would be no further interest in them. However, recordings of his film music have been issued since his death, often reconstructed by musicologist and composer Philip Lane from the soundtracks of the films themselves and conducted by Kenneth Alwyn or Rumon Gamba.

Later career
He collaborated from 1942 with Joyce Grenfell for her West End revues (including Tuppence Coloured and Penny Plain) and her one-woman shows. He also wrote for West End musical revues directed by Laurier Lister, including Airs on a Shoestring  Addinsell's music is in the "English light music" style. He regularly composed at the piano, providing other creative musicians such as Roy Douglas, Leonard Isaacs or Douglas Gamley with broad indications for their full orchestrations. Orchestral works composed (or adapted) for the concert hall include The Invitation Waltz (1950), the Smokey Mountains Concerto (1950) and The Isle of Apples (1965).

Personal life
Addinsell retired from public life in the 1960s, gradually becoming estranged from his close friends. He was, for many years, the companion of the fashion designer Victor Stiebel, who died in 1976.

Addinsell died in Brighton in 1977 aged 73. His cremation took place at Golders Green Crematorium on 18 November 1977.
His ashes are buried there in a communal section of the crocus lawn.

Film credits

His Lordship (1932)
The Amateur Gentleman (1936)
Fire Over England (1937)
Dark Journey (1937)
Farewell Again (1937) 
South Riding (1938)
Vessel of Wrath (1938)
Goodbye Mr. Chips (1939)
The Lion Has Wings (1940)
Men of the Lightship (1940; documentary)
Britain at Bay (1940; documentary)
Contraband (1940)
Gaslight (1940)
W.R.N.S. (1941)
Old Bill and Son (1941)
Dangerous Moonlight (1941; containing the Warsaw Concerto)
This England (1941)
Love on the Dole (1941)
This Is Colour (1942; documentary)
The Big Blockade (1942)
The Day Will Dawn (1942)
The Siege of Tobruk (1942; documentary)
Troop Ship (1942; documentary—music for song Hold your hats on)
The New Lot (1943)

We Sail at Midnight (1943; documentary)
A Diary for Timothy (1945; documentary)
Blithe Spirit (1945)
Soldier Sailor (1945; documentary—music for song I'm going to see you today)
The Passionate Friends (1949)
Under Capricorn (1949)
The Black Rose (1950) 
Highly Dangerous (1950)   
Scrooge (1951)
Tom Brown's Schooldays (1951)
Encore (1951)
The Secret Cave (1953) 
Sea Devils (1953) 
Beau Brummell (1954)
Out of the Clouds (1955) 
The Prince and the Showgirl (1957)
The Admirable Crichton (1957; uncredited)
A Tale of Two Cities (1958)
The Greengage Summer (1961) 
The Roman Spring of Mrs. Stone (1961) 
Waltz of the Toreadors (1962)
The War Lover (1962) 
Life at the Top (1965)

Note: The source for the television and film appearances is the British Film Institute.

References

External links
  
 Richard Addinsell at the British Film Institute website

1904 births
1977 deaths
20th-century British male musicians
20th-century British musicians
20th-century classical musicians
20th-century English composers
20th-century English LGBT people
Alumni of Hertford College, Oxford
Alumni of the Royal College of Music
English film score composers
English male film score composers
Light music composers
LGBT classical musicians
LGBT film score composers
English LGBT musicians
Musicians from London
Musicians from Brighton and Hove